Matteo Aicardi (born 19 April 1986) is an Italian water polo center forward. He won the world title in 2011 and two medals at the 2012 and 2016 Olympics. In 2012 he was awarded the Gold Collar of Sporting Merit from the Italian Olympic Committee.

Honours

Club
Savona
LEN Euro Cup: 2010–11, 2011–12
Pro Recco
LEN Champions League: 2014–15, 2020–21, 2021–22   ;runners-up : 2017–18
 LEN Super Cup: 2015, 2021, 2022
Serie A: 2012–13 , 2013–14 , 2014–15 , 2015–16, 2016–17,  2017–18 , 2018–19, 2021–22
Coppa Italia: 2012–13 , 2013–14, 2014–15 , 2015–16 , 2016–17,  2017–18,  2018–19 , 2020–21,  2021–22

See also
 List of Olympic medalists in water polo (men)
 List of world champions in men's water polo
 List of World Aquatics Championships medalists in water polo

References

External links

 

1986 births
Living people
People from Savona
Italian male water polo players
Water polo centre forwards
Water polo players at the 2012 Summer Olympics
Water polo players at the 2016 Summer Olympics
Medalists at the 2012 Summer Olympics
Medalists at the 2016 Summer Olympics
Olympic silver medalists for Italy in water polo
Olympic bronze medalists for Italy in water polo
World Aquatics Championships medalists in water polo
Water polo players at the 2020 Summer Olympics
Sportspeople from the Province of Savona
21st-century Italian people